Hanover Township may refer to the following townships in the United States:

Illinois
 Hanover Township, Cook County, Illinois
 Hanover Township, Jo Daviess County, Illinois

Indiana
 Hanover Township, Jefferson County, Indiana
 Hanover Township, Lake County, Indiana
 Hanover Township, Shelby County, Indiana

Iowa
 Hanover Township, Allamakee County, Iowa
 Hanover Township, Crawford County, Iowa

Kansas
Hanover Township, Lincoln County, Kansas
Hanover Township, Washington County, Kansas

Michigan
 Hanover Township, Jackson County, Michigan
 Hanover Township, Wexford County, Michigan

Nebraska
 Hanover Township, Adams County, Nebraska
 Hanover Township, Gage County, Nebraska

New Jersey
 Hanover Township, New Jersey

Ohio
 Hanover Township, Ashland County, Ohio
 Hanover Township, Butler County, Ohio
 Hanover Township, Columbiana County, Ohio
 Hanover Township, Licking County, Ohio

Pennsylvania
 Hanover Township, Beaver County, Pennsylvania
 Hanover Township, Lehigh County, Pennsylvania
 Hanover Township, Luzerne County, Pennsylvania
 Hanover Township, Northampton County, Pennsylvania
 Hanover Township, Washington County, Pennsylvania

Township name disambiguation pages